SM UB-30 was a German Type UB II submarine or U-boat in the German Imperial Navy during World War I. The U-boat was ordered on 22 July 1915 and launched on 16 November 1915. She was commissioned into the German Imperial Navy on 18 March 1916 as SM UB-30.

The submarine sank 18 ships in 19 patrols. They included the William Cory & Son collier SS Vernon in the North Sea off Spurn on 31 August 1917 and the Witherington and Everett Steam Ship Company collier SS Lightfoot in the English Channel off Selsey Bill on 16 March 1918.

Design
A German Type UB II submarine, UB-30 had a displacement of  when at the surface and  while submerged. The submarine was powered by two Benz six-cylinder diesel engines producing a total , two Siemens-Schuckert electric motors producing , and one propeller shaft.

UB-30 was fitted with two  torpedo tubes, four torpedoes, and one  Uk L/30 deck gun. She had a complement of twenty-one crew members and two officers and a 42-second dive time.

Summary of raiding history

References

Notes

Citations

Bibliography 

 

1915 ships
Ships built in Hamburg
World War I submarines of Germany
German Type UB II submarines
U-boats commissioned in 1916
Maritime incidents in 1918
U-boats sunk in 1918
U-boats sunk by depth charges
U-boats sunk by British warships
World War I shipwrecks in the North Sea
Ships lost with all hands